People's Writer (Narodný pisatelj) was a title granted by the Republics of the Soviet Union and the Autonomous Soviet Socialist Republics to its distinguished writers. 

It was a title similar to that of People's Artist of the USSR for literary achievements.

Honorary titles
Soviet art
Soviet literary awards